United Nations Security Council Resolution 2079 was unanimously adopted on 12 December 2012 to extend the UN's mandate in Liberia. This renewed the arms embargo for an additional period of 12 months with regard to all non-governmental entities as well as individuals operating in the territory of Liberia.

See also 
List of United Nations Security Council Resolutions 2001 to 2100

References

External links
Text of the Resolution at undocs.org

2012 United Nations Security Council resolutions
United Nations Security Council resolutions concerning Liberia
2012 in Liberia
December 2012 events